Sølvi Valborg Wang (28 August 1929 – 31 May 2011) was a Norwegian singer, actress and comedian.

She was born in Bærum, Akershus, to the jazz musician Yngvar Wang and the singer Marie Gulbrandsen. Already at an early age she sang with her father's orchestra on the radio and in concert. She met Egil Monn-Iversen while in school, and in 1948 she founded the music group The Monn Keys together with him. Wang debuted as a recording artist in 1950, in a duet with Arve Opsahl. Later she recorded solo albums, and was responsible for 18 releases in the years up until 1955. She combined her solo career with performances with The Monn Keys, which now also included the singers Nora Brockstedt and Per Asplin. In 1954 the group performed their first variety show, Over alle grenser, at Chat Noir in Oslo. She worked at Chat Noir in the years 1952 to 1963, then at Edderkoppen from 1963 to 1964, before moving to Det Norske Teatret. Though she continued to regularly appear in comedy shows at Chat Noir until the mid-1980s.

In addition to making recordings and performing in variety shows, Wang also performed in musicals, on television and in movies. For 25 years she was the leading lady of Det Norske Teatret, where she played the lead roles in such musicals as West Side Story, Fiddler on the Roof, Annie Get Your Gun and The King and I. She also acted in musicals composed by her husband Monn-Iversen, most prominently among these Bør Børson Jr., based on a novel by Johan Falkberget. 

Among her many television shows, That's Entertainment from 1966 gained her international attention when it won the award for best comedy show at the Montreux Comedy Festival. The award led to performances at The Ed Sullivan Show, and with Jack Parnell's orchestra at the London Palladium. She was even offered her own sitcom at BBC, but had to decline due to her family. Wang had the lead role in movies such as the 1964 comedy Pappa tar gull and the 1978 drama Hvem har bestemt?.

Sølvi Wang acted in a production of the musical Fiddler on the Roof in 1987. This performance marked her retirement from the public stage; since then she has not made any public performances. As a singer, even though she mastered the soft, subdued style of ballads in recordings, her vocal style has been described primarily as belting. This powerful, often sharp way of singing was a necessity in the world of live musical performance prior to the introduction of miniature microphones. Wang has been called the only master of the style in Norwegian theatre history.

Wang is related to the American football quarterback Boomer Esiason, and was his father's cousin.

Select filmography

References

External links

1929 births
2011 deaths
Melodi Grand Prix contestants
Norwegian musical theatre actresses
Norwegian women singers
Norwegian stage actresses
Leonard Statuette winners
People from Bærum
Norwegian television actresses
Norwegian film actresses